The collapse of Block 7 at Lotus Riverside (a 13-story residential apartment building located in Minhang District, Shanghai, China) in 2009 is an accident that killed one person.

Events
On June 27, 2009 at 5:30 Am UTC+8, Block 7, one of the eleven 13-story buildings of the apartment complex, collapsed, killing one worker named Xiao Ling.

Explanations
According to the Wall Street Journal, which referenced Shanghai Daily:
"According to Shanghai Daily, initial investigations attribute the accident to the excavations for the construction of a garage under the collapsed building. Large quantities of earth were removed and dumped in a landfill next to a nearby creek; the weight of the earth caused the river bank to collapse, which, in turn, allowed water to seep into the ground, creating a muddy foundation for the building that toppled."

External links
Shanghai probes building collapse - BBC News
WSJ: Shanghai Building Collapses, Nearly Intact
Authorities put 9 under control over fatal building collapse via Wayback Machine.

References

Building collapses in 2009
2009 disasters in China
2000s in Shanghai
Building collapses in China